Cynics is a 1991 Soviet drama film directed by Dmitry Meskhiev.

Plot 
The film takes place in 1918 in Petrograd. The film tells about the young historian Vladimir, who meets with Olga, who hates the revolution as much as she loves her.

Cast 
 Sergey Batalov
 Yury Belyayev
 Ingeborga Dapkunaite
 Andrey Ilyin
 Viktor Pavlov
 Irina Rozanova		
 Aleksandr Shekhtel	
 Yekaterina Vasilyeva

References

External links 
 

1991 films
1990s Russian-language films
Soviet drama films
1991 drama films